El colapso is a Mexican dystopian streaming television miniseries based on the French series L’Effondrement. The series is produced by Perro Azul and Pirexia Films. Each episode follows the perspective of different characters and how they survive an event of unknown origin that collapses the financial, technological, environmental and political system.

It premiered on Vix+ on 10 February 2023.

Notable guest stars 
 Enrique Arrizon
 Ana Valeria Becerril
 Tiaré Scanda
 Osvaldo Benavides
 Gustavo Sánchez Parra
 Armando Hernández
 Isabel Burr
 Irán Castillo
 Flavio Medina
 Ximena Lamadrid
 Kristyan Ferrer
 Adriana Paz
 José María de Tavira

Production 
On 8 August 2022, it was announced that production had begun on the series. The series was filmed entirely in sequence shots.

Episodes

References

External links 
 

2020s Mexican television series
2023 Mexican television series debuts
2023 Mexican television series endings
Spanish-language television shows
Vix (streaming service) original programming